The 1999 Leeds City Council election took place on 6 May 1999 to elect members of City of Leeds Metropolitan Borough Council in West Yorkshire, England. One third of the council was up for election, as well as a vacancy each in Horsforth, Moortown and Wetherby. Prior to the election, the Liberal Democrats had gained a seat in Bramley from Labour, and Hunslet councillor, Mark Davies, had defected from Labour to Independent Socialist.

Labour stayed in overall control of the council. Overall turnout in the election was 27.3%.

Election result

This result had the following consequences for the total number of seats on the council after the elections:

Ward results

By-elections between 1999 and 2000

References

1999 English local elections
1999
1990s in Leeds